Yin Kong is a village in Sheung Shui, North District, Hong Kong.

Administration
Yin Kong is a recognized village under the New Territories Small House Policy. It is one of the villages represented within the Sheung Shui District Rural Committee. For electoral purposes, Yin Kong is part of the Sheung Shui Rural constituency, which is currently represented by Simon Hau Fuk-tat.

History
The Hau Clan, one of the Five Great Clans of the New Territories, arrived in modern-day Hong Kong towards the end of the 12th century, during the Southern Song Dynasty. They first settled at Ho Sheung Heung. They later settled three branch-villages: Yin Kong, Kam Tsin and Ping Kong.

At the time of the 1911 census, the population of Yin Kong was 35. The number of males was 21.

References

External links

 Delineation of area of existing village Yin Kong (Sheung Shui) for election of resident representative (2019 to 2022)

Sheung Shui
Villages in North District, Hong Kong